Dakhovskaya (Daẋo)  is a rural locality (a stanitsa) and the administrative center of Kuzhorskoye Rural Settlement of Maykopsky District, Russia. The population was 1363 as of 2018. There are 41 streets.

Geography 
The stanitsa is located on the right bank of the Belaya River, 36 km south of Tulsky (the district's administrative centre) by road. Ust-Sakhray is the nearest rural locality.

References 

Rural localities in Maykopsky District